The 2017 Quaker State 400 presented by Advance Auto Parts was a Monster Energy NASCAR Cup Series race held on July 8, 2017 at Kentucky Speedway in Sparta, Kentucky. Contested over 274 laps extended from 267 laps due to overtime, on the  speedway, it was the 18th race of the 2017 Monster Energy NASCAR Cup Series season.

Report

Background

The sixth running of the Quaker State 400 was held in Sparta, Kentucky at Kentucky Speedway on July 9, 2016. The track is a  tri-oval speedway owned by Speedway Motorsports, Inc. Kentucky Speedway, which has also hosted the ARCA Racing Series, NASCAR Camping World Truck Series, NASCAR Xfinity Series, and the Indy Racing League, has a grandstand seating capacity of 107,000.

Entry list

Practice

First practice

Final practice

Qualifying

Kyle Busch scored the pole for the race with a time of 28.379 and a speed of  after only two rounds of qualifying were completed due to weather.

Qualifying results

Race

First stage
Kyle Busch led the field to the green flag at 7:49 p.m. He led the first 29 laps before Martin Truex Jr. edged him out at the line to take the lead on Lap 30. Busch took it back the following lap, just as caution #1, a scheduled competition caution due to rain, flew for the first time. It went back to green on Lap 36. Truex drove down and passed Busch on Lap 69, and drove on to win the first stage. Caution #2 flew moments after on Lap 81 for the conclusion of the stage. Under the caution, Denny Hamlin and Kyle Larson were sent to the tail-end of the field on the following restart for speeding on pit road.

Second stage
Busch retook the lead from Truex going into Turn 3 on the Lap 88 restart. Entering Turn 3 further back in the field on the same lap, Brad Keselowski got loose and spun out, collecting Clint Bowyer and Jimmie Johnson, who suffered critical damage to his right-front wheel well after contact with Keselowski. This brought out the third caution. Restarting on Lap 93, caution #4 flew two laps later when Kasey Kahne tried to force his way underneath Trevor Bayne, sending Bayne spinning and himself into the Turn 1 wall. Caution flew for the fifth time 12 laps after the Lap 100 restart when Bayne got loose and spun out exiting Turn 4.

The race settled into a longer green run after the Lap 117 restart, forcing Busch to navigate lapped traffic. Doing so allowed Truex to reel him in and retake the lead on Lap 136. Joey Gase brought out the sixth caution two laps later when he suffered a tire failure and slammed the wall in Turn 2. Truex took off when the race went back green on Lap 142 and won the second stage on Lap 161. Under the stage break caution, Joey Logano chose not to pit and assumed the race lead.

Final stage

Four laps after the Lap 167 restart, Truex took back the lead and set sail from the field. Aside from the five laps Dale Earnhardt Jr. spent in the lead during a cycle of green flag stops, Truex had the race in check, with as much as a 16-second lead over the second-place car. Kurt Busch's engine gave up on the frontstretch and that brought out caution #7 with two laps to go, forcing an overtime finish. Truex opted to stay out, while Kyle Busch, Larson and the other five drivers on the lead lap hit pit road. The final restart had Truex restart on the outside line, with Busch to his inside with 2 fresh left side tires.

Overtime
Larson with 4 fresh tires gave a shove to Truex coming to the green, giving him the lead going into Turn 1. Coming to the white flag, Darrell Wallace Jr. drove Matt Kenseth up out of the racing groove, which got loose and spun out in front of Daniel Suárez, triggering a four-car wreck in Turn 4 that ended the race under caution. It rendered victory unto Truex.

Race results

Stage results

Stage 1
Laps: 80

Stage 2
Laps: 80

Final stage results

Stage 3
Laps: 114

Race statistics
 Lead changes: 4 among different drivers
 Cautions/Laps: 9 for 39
 Red flags: 0
 Time of race: 2 hours, 57 minutes and 55 seconds
 Average speed:

Media

Television
NBC Sports covered the race on the television side. Rick Allen, Jeff Burton and Steve Letarte had the call in the booth for the race. Dave Burns, Marty Snider and Kelli Stavast reported from pit lane during the race.

Radio
PRN had the radio call for the race, which was simulcast on Sirius XM NASCAR Radio.

Standings after the race

Drivers' Championship standings

Manufacturers' Championship standings

Note: Only the first 16 positions are included for the driver standings.
. – Driver has clinched a position in the Monster Energy NASCAR Cup Series playoffs.

References

2017 Quaker State 400
2017 Monster Energy NASCAR Cup Series
2017 in sports in Kentucky
July 2017 sports events in the United States